Gardes-Marines III or  is a 1992 Soviet two-series television movie (mini-series), the third of a series of films about Russian Gardes-Marines of the 18th century, directed by Svetlana Druzhinina.

Plot
There is a Seven Years' War, Russian soldiers are compelled to fight for the interests of France and Austria against Prussia. The midshipmen continue to serve their homeland selflessly. One - on the expedition, the other - at the court, and the third was sent to Venice, to transfer the box with the decoration. In fact, in the box the message, on which the future destinies of Europe and Russia depend.

Cast
 Dmitry Kharatyan – Aleksei Korsak, captain
 Mikhail Mamaev – Nikita Olenev (voice by Andrey Gradov)
 Aleksandr Domogarov – Pavel Gorin
 Viktor Rakov – Baron von Brockdorf
 Kristina Orbakaitė – Grand Duchess Ekaterina Alekseevna, "Princess Fiquet", future Empress Catherine the Great
 Lyudmila Gurchenko – Joanna Elisabeth of Holstein-Gottorp, Ekaterina's mother
 Natalya Gundareva – Elizabeth of Russia
 Yevgeniy Yevstigneyev – Alexey Bestuzhev-Ryumin, Chancellor of Russian Empire
 Herb Andress – Frederick the Great (voice by Armen Dzhigarkhanyan)
 Barbara Rudnik – Elisabeth Christine of Brunswick-Wolfenbüttel-Bevern
 Yury Yakovlev – Field-marshal Stepan Fyodorovich Apraksin
 Lev Durov – Cavalry general Denisov
 Nahla Jaman – Petra (voice by Marina Dyuzheva)
 Vladimir Shiryaev – Frederick's physician

Soundtrack
"Do not hang your nose!" (Не вешать нос!) – Dmitry Kharatyan and Aleksandr Domogarov
"Offense is cheap in Russia" (Дёшева обида на Руси) – Dmitry Kharatyan

References

External links

1992 films
Russian sequel films
1990s Russian-language films
Mosfilm films
1990s historical adventure films
Russian historical adventure films
Russian musical films
Seven Years' War films
Russian swashbuckler films
Films set in the Russian Empire